Hypnotic (from Greek Hypnos, sleep), or soporific drugs, commonly known as sleeping pills, are a class of (and umbrella term for) psychoactive drugs whose primary function is to induce sleep (or surgical anesthesia) and to treat insomnia (sleeplessness).

This group of drugs is related to sedatives. Whereas the term sedative describes drugs that serve to calm or relieve anxiety, the term hypnotic generally describes drugs whose main purpose is to initiate, sustain, or lengthen sleep. Because these two functions frequently overlap, and because drugs in this class generally produce dose-dependent effects (ranging from anxiolysis to loss of consciousness), they are often referred to collectively as sedative–hypnotic drugs.

Hypnotic drugs are regularly prescribed for insomnia and other sleep disorders, with over 95% of insomnia patients being prescribed hypnotics in some countries. Many hypnotic drugs are habit-forming and—due to many factors known to disturb the human sleep pattern—a physician may instead recommend changes in the environment before and during sleep, better sleep hygiene, the avoidance of caffeine and alcohol or other stimulating substances, or behavioral interventions such as cognitive behavioral therapy for insomnia (CBT-I), before prescribing medication for sleep. When prescribed, hypnotic medication should be used for the shortest period of time necessary.

Among individuals with sleep disorders, 13.7% are taking or prescribed nonbenzodiazepines, while 10.8% are taking benzodiazepines, as of 2010, in the USA. Early classes of drugs, such as barbiturates, have fallen out of use in most practices but are still prescribed for some patients. In children, prescribing hypnotics is not yet acceptable—unless used to treat night terrors or sleepwalking. Elderly people are more sensitive to potential side effects of daytime fatigue and cognitive impairments, and a meta-analysis found that the risks generally outweigh any marginal benefits of hypnotics in the elderly. A review of the literature regarding benzodiazepine hypnotics and Z-drugs concluded that these drugs can have adverse effects, such as dependence and accidents, and that optimal treatment uses the lowest effective dose for the shortest therapeutic time period, with gradual discontinuation in order to improve health without worsening of sleep.

Falling outside the above-mentioned categories, the neurohormone melatonin and its analogues (such as ramelteon) serve a hypnotic function.

History

Hypnotica was a class of somniferous drugs and substances tested in medicine of the 1890s and later. These include Urethan, Acetal, Methylal, Sulfonal, paraldehyde, Amylenhydrate, Hypnon, Chloralurethan and Ohloralamid or Chloralimid.

Research about using medications to treat insomnia evolved throughout the last half of the 20th century. Treatment for insomnia in psychiatry dates back to 1869, when chloral hydrate was first used as a soporific. Barbiturates emerged as the first class of drugs in the early 1900s, after which chemical substitution allowed derivative compounds. Although they were the best drug family at the time (with less toxicity and fewer side effects), they were dangerous in overdose and tended to cause physical and psychological dependence.

During the 1970s, quinazolinones and benzodiazepines were introduced as safer alternatives to replace barbiturates; by the late 1970s, benzodiazepines emerged as the safer drug.

Benzodiazepines are not without their drawbacks; substance dependence is possible, and deaths from overdoses sometimes occur, especially in combination with alcohol and/or other depressants. Questions have been raised as to whether they disturb sleep architecture.

Nonbenzodiazepines are the most recent development (1990s–present). Although it is clear that they are less toxic than barbiturates, their predecessors, comparative efficacy over benzodiazepines have not been established. Such efficacy is hard to determine without longitudinal studies. However, some psychiatrists recommend these drugs, citing research suggesting they are equally potent with less potential for abuse.

Other sleep remedies that may be considered "sedative–hypnotics" exist; psychiatrists will sometimes prescribe medicines off-label if they have sedating effects. Examples of these include mirtazapine (an antidepressant), clonidine (an older antihypertensive drug), quetiapine (an antipsychotic), and the over-the-counter allergy and antiemetic medications doxylamine and diphenhydramine. Off-label sleep remedies are particularly useful when first-line treatment is unsuccessful or deemed unsafe (as in patients with a history of substance abuse).

Types

Barbiturates

Barbiturates are drugs that act as central nervous system depressants, and can therefore produce a wide spectrum of effects, from mild sedation to total anesthesia. They are also effective as anxiolytics, hypnotics, and anticonvulsalgesic effects; however, these effects are somewhat weak, preventing barbiturates from being used in surgery in the absence of other analgesics. They have dependence liability, both physical and psychological. Barbiturates have now largely been replaced by benzodiazepines in routine medical practice – such as in the treatment of anxiety and insomnia – mainly because benzodiazepines are significantly less dangerous in overdose. However, barbiturates are still used in general anesthesia, for epilepsy, and for assisted suicide. Barbiturates are derivatives of barbituric acid.

The principal mechanism of action of barbiturates is believed to be positive allosteric modulation of GABAA receptors.

Examples include amobarbital, pentobarbital, phenobarbital, secobarbital, and sodium thiopental.

Quinazolinones

Quinazolinones are also a class of drugs which function as hypnotic/sedatives that contain a 4-quinazolinone core. Their use has also been proposed in the treatment of cancer.

Examples of quinazolinones include cloroqualone, diproqualone, etaqualone (Aolan, Athinazone, Ethinazone), mebroqualone, Afloqualone (Arofuto), mecloqualone (Nubarene, Casfen), and methaqualone (Quaalude).

Benzodiazepines

Benzodiazepines can be useful for short-term treatment of insomnia. Their use beyond 2 to 4 weeks is not recommended due to the risk of dependence. It is preferred that benzodiazepines be taken intermittently—and at the lowest effective dose. They improve sleep-related problems by shortening the time spent in bed before falling asleep, prolonging the sleep time, and, in general, reducing wakefulness. Like alcohol, benzodiazepines are commonly used to treat insomnia in the short-term (both prescribed and self-medicated), but worsen sleep in the long-term. While benzodiazepines can put people to sleep (i.e., inhibit NREM stage 1 and 2 sleep), while asleep, the drugs disrupt sleep architecture by decreasing sleep time, delaying time to REM sleep, and decreasing deep slow-wave sleep (the most restorative part of sleep for both energy and mood).

Other drawbacks of hypnotics, including benzodiazepines, are possible tolerance to their effects, rebound insomnia, and reduced slow-wave sleep and a withdrawal period typified by rebound insomnia and a prolonged period of anxiety and agitation. The list of benzodiazepines approved for the treatment of insomnia is fairly similar among most countries, but which benzodiazepines are officially designated as first-line hypnotics prescribed for the treatment of insomnia can vary distinctly between countries. Longer-acting benzodiazepines such as nitrazepam and diazepam have residual effects that may persist into the next day and are, in general, not recommended.

It is not clear as to whether the new nonbenzodiazepine hypnotics (Z-drugs) are better than the short-acting benzodiazepines. The efficacy of these two groups of medications is similar. According to the US Agency for Healthcare Research and Quality, indirect comparison indicates that side-effects from benzodiazepines may be about twice as frequent as from nonbenzodiazepines. Some experts suggest using nonbenzodiazepines preferentially as a first-line long-term treatment of insomnia. However, the UK National Institute for Health and Clinical Excellence (NICE) did not find any convincing evidence in favor of Z-drugs. A NICE review pointed out that short-acting Z-drugs were inappropriately compared in clinical trials with long-acting benzodiazepines. There have been no trials comparing short-acting Z-drugs with appropriate doses of short-acting benzodiazepines. Based on this, NICE recommended choosing the hypnotic based on cost and the patient's preference.

Older adults should not use benzodiazepines to treat insomnia—unless other treatments have failed to be effective. When benzodiazepines are used, patients, their caretakers, and their physician should discuss the increased risk of harms, including evidence which shows twice the incidence of traffic collisions among driving patients, as well as falls and hip fracture for all older patients.

Their mechanism of action is primarily at GABAA receptors.

Nonbenzodiazepines

Nonbenzodiazepines are a class of psychoactive drugs that are very "benzodiazepine-like" in nature. Nonbenzodiazepine pharmacodynamics are almost entirely the same as benzodiazepine drugs, and therefore entail similar benefits, side-effects and risks. Nonbenzodiazepines, however, have dissimilar or entirely different chemical structures, and therefore are unrelated to benzodiazepines on a molecular level.

Examples include zopiclone (Imovane, Zimovane), eszopiclone (Lunesta), zaleplon (Sonata), and zolpidem (Ambien, Stilnox, Stilnoct).

Research on nonbenzodiazepines is new and conflicting. A review by a team of researchers suggests the use of these drugs for people that have trouble falling asleep (but not staying asleep), as next-day impairments were minimal. The team noted that the safety of these drugs had been established, but called for more research into their long-term effectiveness in treating insomnia. Other evidence suggests that tolerance to nonbenzodiazepines may be slower to develop than with benzodiazepines. A different team was more skeptical, finding little benefit over benzodiazepines.

Others

Melatonin
Melatonin, the hormone produced in the pineal gland in the brain and secreted in dim light and darkness, among its other functions, promotes sleep in diurnal mammals. Ramelteon and tasimelteon are synthetic analogues of melatonin which are also used for sleep-related indications.

Antihistamines

In common use, the term antihistamine refers only to compounds that inhibit action at the H1 receptor (and not H2, etc.).

Clinically, H1 antagonists are used to treat certain allergies. Sedation is a common side-effect, and some H1 antagonists, such as diphenhydramine (Benadryl) and doxylamine, are also used to treat insomnia.

Second-generation antihistamines cross the blood–brain barrier to a much lower degree than the first ones. This results in their primarily affecting peripheral histamine receptors, and therefore having a much lower sedative effect. High doses can still induce the central nervous system effect of drowsiness.

Antidepressants
Some antidepressants have sedating effects.

Examples include:

 Serotonin antagonists and reuptake inhibitors
 Trazodone
 Tricyclic antidepressants
 Amitriptyline
 Doxepin
 Trimipramine
 Tetracyclic antidepressants
 Mianserin
 Mirtazapine

Antipsychotics
While some of these drugs are frequently prescribed for insomnia, such use is not recommended unless the insomnia is due to an underlying mental health condition treatable by antipsychotics as the risks frequently outweigh the benefits. Some of the more serious adverse effects have been observed to occur at the low doses used for this off-label prescribing, such as dyslipidemia and neutropenia,  and a recent network meta-analysis of 154 double-blind, randomized controlled trials of drug therapies vs. placebo for insomnia in adults found that quetiapine did not demonstrated any short-term benefits in sleep quality. Examples of antipsychotics with sedation as a side effect that are occasionally used for insomnia:

 First-generation
 Chlorpromazine
 Second-generation
 Clozapine
 Olanzapine
 Quetiapine
 Risperidone
 Zotepine

Miscellaneous drugs

 Alpha-adrenergic agonist
 Clonidine
 Guanfacine

 Cannabinoids
 Cannabidiol
 Tetrahydrocannabinol

 Orexin receptor antagonist
 Suvorexant
 Lemborexant
 Daridorexant

 Gabapentinoids
 Gabapentin
 Pregabalin
 Phenibut

Effectiveness
A major systematic review and network meta-analysis of medications for the treatment of insomnia was published in 2022. It found a wide range of effect sizes (standardized mean difference (SMD)) in terms of efficacy for insomnia. The assessed medications included benzodiazepines (e.g., temazepam, triazolam, many others) (SMDs 0.58 to 0.83), Z-drugs (eszopiclone, zaleplon, zolpidem, zopiclone) (SMDs 0.03 to 0.63), sedative antidepressants and antihistamines (doxepin, doxylamine, trazodone, trimipramine) (SMDs 0.30 to 0.55), the antipsychotic quetiapine (SMD 0.07), orexin receptor antagonists (daridorexant, lemborexant, seltorexant, suvorexant) (SMDs 0.23 to 0.44), and melatonin receptor agonists (melatonin, ramelteon) (SMDs 0.00 to 0.13). The certainty of evidence varied and ranged from high to very low depending on the medication. Certain medications often used as hypnotics, including the antihistamines diphenhydramine, hydroxyzine, and promethazine and the antidepressants amitriptyline and mirtazapine, were not included in analyses due to insufficient data.

Risks
The use of sedative medications in older people generally should be avoided. These medications are associated with poorer health outcomes, including cognitive decline.

Therefore, sedatives and hypnotics should be avoided in people with dementia, according to the clinical guidelines known as the Medication Appropriateness Tool for Comorbid Health Conditions in Dementia (MATCH-D). The use of these medications can further impede cognitive function for people with dementia, who are also more sensitive to side effects of medications.

See also 
 Sleep induction § Alcohol

Notes

References

Further reading 

  discusses Barbs vs. benzos

External links 

 Sleeping pills overview

 
Psychoactive drugs
Treatment of sleep disorders